Nieuil is a commune in the Charente department in southwestern France.

History

Novioialos was a Gaulish site established next to a pagan fountain, and was Christianized under the patronage of Saint-Vivien.

In the eleventh century, the area and the Church belonged to the Viscounts of Rochechouart that created the benedictine Abbaye Saint-Pierre d'Uzerche, the forest was then cleared by the monks of the Priory of Sainte Marie-Madeleine de I'Espinassouze.

All that remains is the apse of the Church, a wall of the chapel of I' Espinassouze and the foundations of the mill.

The Châtellenie of Nieuil passed successively through the noble families Raja, Jaubert, Green Saint, - Marsault – (builders of the first castle) and Perry Fief of the barony of Champagne Mouton, it remained an enclave of Poitou until the French Revolution.

In the sixteenth century a discovery of iron ore in the forest led to the creation of a forge. The owner, Louis Lavergne Champlaurier was guillotined in 1794, with his wife Victoire.

Nearby towns 
Saint-Claud 3.2 km
Suaux 3.3 km
Roumazières-Loubert 6.5 km
Chasseneuil-sur-Bonnieure 7.2 km

Transport
Rail

Nieuil no longer has a railway connection and the closest stations are:

Roumazières-Loubert Railway Station (6 km)

Chasseneuil-sur-Bonnieure Railway Station (7 km)

Air

The closest airport to Nieuil is Angoulême – Brie – Champniers Airport (27 km) however it doesn't have scheduled flights since the airport and its local authority consortium pulled out of a contract with the Ryanair in 2010.  Slightly further afield is Limoges Airport which runs daily flights as below

Population

See also
Communes of the Charente department

References

Communes of Charente